Pentonville is an area on the northern fringe of Central London, in the London Borough of Islington. Pentonville developed in the northwestern edge of the ancient parish of Clerkenwell on the New Road. It is named after Henry Penton, the developer of the area.

History

The area is named after Henry Penton, who developed a number of streets in the 1770s in what was open countryside adjacent to the New Road. Pentonville was part of the ancient parish of Clerkenwell, and was incorporated into the Metropolitan Borough of Finsbury by the London Government Act 1899.  It has been part of the London Borough of Islington since 1965.

Pentonville is the birthplace of John Stuart Mill (1806) and Forbes Benignus Winslow (1810), the noted psychiatrist. In 1902 Vladimir Lenin and his wife lived just off Pentonville Road, and it was at this time that he first met his fellow exile Leon Trotsky.

Geography

Nearby places include Islington, St. Pancras and Finsbury.

Pentonville is not the location of HM Prison Pentonville, which is located on Caledonian Road, some distance north in Barnsbury.

Transport
The closest tube stations are Angel and King's Cross St Pancras.

Culture
"Pentonville" is a track on the Babyshambles album Down in Albion.

Mr Brownlow, the gentleman whose books were stolen in Oliver Twist, lived in "a quiet shady street near Pentonville" in the novel and most film versions. However, in the musical adaptation, Oliver!, he lives in Bloomsbury Square.

Mr Guppy, law clerk in  Dickens's novel Bleak House, has "lodgings at Penton Place, Pentonville. It is lowly, but airy, open at the back, and considered one of the 'ealthiest outlets."

References

Districts of the London Borough of Islington
Areas of London